Concrete Valley is a Canadian drama film, directed by Antoine Bourges and released in 2022. The film centres on a family of Syrian immigrants to Canada who are struggling to establish themselves in the Thorncliffe Park neighbourhood of Toronto, Ontario. The film has a cast of predominantly amateur actors. 

The film was written by Bourges and Teyama Alkamli, based in part on interviews with the cast about their own real experiences as immigrants. It stars Hussam Douhna as Rashid, who was a doctor in Syria but has been humiliated by his inability to use his skills in his new home; Amani Ibrahim as his wife Fahra, who finds meaning by participating in a volunteer neighbourhood cleanup crew; and Abdullah Nadaf as their son Ammar. Aliya Kanani, the main professional actress in the cast, has a supporting role as the leader of the community cleanup group.

The film premiered in the Wavelengths program at the 2022 Toronto International Film Festival. It is slated to screen at the 73rd Berlin Film Festival in February 2023.

References

External links 
 

2022 films
2022 drama films
Canadian docufiction films
Films shot in Toronto
Films set in Toronto
Films directed by Antoine Bourges
English-language Canadian films
2020s Canadian films